Nanchoc District is one of thirteen districts of San Miguel Province in the Cajamarca Region of Peru. The capital of the district is the town of Nanchoc which had a population of 332 in 2017. The Nanchoc River, a tributary of the Zaña River, bisects the district.

Between the valley and the ocean is a low range of mountains and the Peruvian coastal desert. East of Nanchoc the Andes rise sharply and the greater precipitation in the Andes feeds the Nanchoc River and its tributaries, permitting irrigated agriculture to flourish in the valley.

History
Nanchoc district was created 2 December 1958 by Law No. 13039 del 2, during the second government of President Manuel Prado Ugarteche. At the time the district included the population centers of Carahuasi, Bolívar, El Espino, Trigal, La Aventuraza, El Diamante, La Tambora and Tingues. Most of these communities were separated from Nanchoc district in 1989 and placed in Bolivar District.

Archaeology

The canals built by the people of Nanchoc at that time were utilized to irrigate crops such as peanuts, squash, manioc, and chenopods, a relative of Quinoa.

References

Archaeological sites in Peru
Andean preceramic